Paracymbiomma is a genus of South American long-spinneret ground spiders. It was first described by B. V. B. Rodrigues, I. Cizauskas and C. A. Rheims in 2018, and it has only been found in Brazil.

Species
 it contains six species:
P. angelim Rodrigues, Cizauskas & Rheims, 2018 (type) – Brazil
P. bocaina Rodrigues, Cizauskas & Rheims, 2018 – Brazil
P. caecus Rodrigues, Cizauskas & Rheims, 2018 – Brazil
P. carajas Rodrigues, Cizauskas & Rheims, 2018 – Brazil
P. doisirmaos Rodrigues, Cizauskas & Rheims, 2018 – Brazil
P. pauferrense Rodrigues, Cizauskas & Rheims, 2018 – Brazil

See also
 List of Prodidominae species

References

Further reading

Prodidominae
Spiders of Brazil